Whizzard! is a 2002 children's fantasy novel written by Steve Barlow and Steve Skidmore, (known as The Two Steves) as the second part of the Tales of the Dark Forest series. It was followed by Trollogy! in 2003.

Plot summary

Tym, a wizard's apprentice from the Dun Indewood suburb of Leafy Bottom, dreams of being a great magician. It is only when he encounters the mysterious Dreamwalker that he learns the secret of travelling at super-speed and becomes a Whizzard! When his newfound skill causes havoc and puts the beautiful Lady Zamarind into a coma, Tym must travel far across the Dark Forest to save her, and discover his true destiny.

References

External links 
  (official)
 

2002 British novels
2002 children's books
Children's fantasy novels
British children's novels
HarperCollins books